Expert International GmbH is a Swiss consumer electronics retail chain headquartered in Zug, Switzerland.

History
The Intercop GmbH was founded in Zurich, Switzerland on October 16, 1967 by initiative of Gunnar Nygren, representing the Swedish radio and TV-retailer association Samex and representatives of five other national retail organizations. The company was renamed Expert International GmbH in 1971. Retailers from other countries began to join the group, which led to the Expert trademark being internationally registered.

In 1999 the Expert Global group was formed following a letter of intent being signed with Associated Volume Buyers Inc. from the United States and Cantrex from Canada. This collaboration was later ended.

Today, Expert International Gmbh is a leading international retail alliance for retailers in the field of consumer electronics and household appliances.

Operations
Expert International has over 5000 affiliated stores in 22 countries, trading both under the brand Expert and other strong national and regional retail banners:

 Austria
 Belgium
 Croatia
 Czech Republic
 Denmark
 Estonia
 Finland
 France
 Germany
 Greece
 Hungary
 Ireland
 Italy
 Netherlands
 Norway
 Poland
 Portugal
 Slovakia
 South Africa
 Spain
 Switzerland

References

External links 
Expert International web-site

Retail companies of Switzerland
Multinational companies headquartered in Switzerland
Retail companies established in 1967
Swiss companies established in 1967
Companies based in Zug